Maidstone United Football Club is a professional football club based in Maidstone, Kent, England. The team compete in the National League, at the fifth tier of the English football league system.

The current club filled the void left by the old Maidstone United, which was a member of The Football League between 1989 and 1992. That club was forced out of the league following bankruptcy but the nucleus of a new club was built around the youth squad. Maidstone Invicta were originally a youth team but made the step up to adult football in 1992 after being elected to the Kent County League Fourth Division in 1993 and subsequently progressed through the non-league pyramid. They changed their name to Maidstone United in 1995. They played in the Isthmian League Premier Division from 2013 having been promoted from the Isthmian League Division One South and won the league in the 2014–15 season to gain promotion to the National League South (formerly the Conference South) for the 2015–16 season. Maidstone gained a second successive promotion to the National League in 2016, bringing fifth-tier football back to the town for the first time since the old club was promoted to the Football League in 1989. Maidstone were relegated in 2019, before winning the National League South title in 2022 and promotion back to the National League. 

Maidstone were without a stadium of their own from their creation until 2012 when the Gallagher Stadium, located near Maidstone town centre, was opened at the start of the 2012–13 season.

It was announced on 10th January 2023 that the club was in the process of a takeover, with a 51% controlling share in the club being sold to local businessman Alan Manchett.

History

1992–2001: The new club and Kent County League years

Maidstone Invicta were originally a youth club and were 'taken over' within days of the Football League side folding. However, the lack of a suitable ground meant the club was effectively relegated seven divisions to the basement of the footballing pyramid and joined the Fourth Division of the Kent County League for the 1993–94 season. The club's home games took place on the original Maidstone's reserve and training pitch, next to the original London Road Stadium. Initially Jim Thompson ran the club, but was banned from football for his part in the demise of Maidstone and Dartford and Paul Bowden-Brown took over as Chairman – a position he retained until 2010.

The newly created Kent County League side was formed with the nucleus of the original club's youth team – and comfortably won the Fourth Division of the County League under the stewardship of Jack Whitely and Bill Tucker in the 1993–94 season; they were formed too late to join a league for the 1992–93 season. They also managed to win the West Kent Challenge Shield and the Tunbridge Wells Charity Cup. During the close season of 1994 the club managed to gain promotion to Division 2 of the league after restructuring. The club went on to win Division 2, picking up the Kent Junior Cup on the way. However, the Stones, who had returned to their original guise of Maidstone United in 1997, took four years and six managers before finally winning promotion to the Kent County League Premier Division with former Stones player turned manager Jason Lillis leading the club to the Division One title. The 1999–2000 season saw Maidstone's début season in the Premier Division, with the team finishing in a respectable third place. The next season saw the club, which was now managed by another former Maidstonian in Matt Toms, successfully apply to become a senior club and finish second in the league. These factors now left the door open to seek elevation to the Kent League (with the County League being a step-7 league and the Kent League being a step-5 league, direct promotion was not possible).

2001–2006: The Kent League years

 The club's application was accepted and the Stones started the 2001–2002 season in the Kent League. However, the club's ground in Maidstone was nowhere near Kent League standards so the Stones agreed to share Sittingbourne's Central Park stadium while trying to overcome various legal obstacles in the way of a move to a new ground in the town at James Whatman Way.

In its first Kent League season since reformation, Maidstone won the Kent League and Cup double under the management of Jim Ward. However, the club could not gain promotion to the Southern League Eastern Division because of problems with the lease on Central Park. The lease problems were not solved and during the 2002 close season both Sittingbourne and Maidstone moved out of Central Park to a new ground, named Bourne Park, which was built on the same complex using the old training pitch.

The 2002–03 season saw Maidstone enter the FA Cup for the first time since reformation, and the club was featured on BBC Sport's 'Road to Cardiff'. The club reached the 2nd qualifying round of the cup, with the highlight of the run coming in the form of a 3–2 win against old foes Tonbridge Angels, with Steve Butler bagging a hat-trick against the Southern League East outfit. In the league, the Stones looked destined to win a second successive title but after a poor run-in, coupled with the withdrawal from the league of Faversham Town, the club bizarrely lost the championship by 0.14 of a point (the League Management Committee decreed that the title would be awarded to the club with the highest earned points per match average, so with Maidstone and Thamesmead Town achieving 63 points from 30 games, the unusual situation arose that the championship was won by Cray Wanderers with 62 points from 29 games). The Stones did pick up some silverware that season, winning both the Kent Senior Trophy and the Kent Charity Cup, but this was overshadowed by continuing lease problems, which meant another attempt to gain promotion to the Southern League was knocked back.

The years 2003 till 2005 contained two indifferent seasons for the Stones, on the pitch at least. Both campaigns saw the club finish 4th in the league, although this disappointment was offset somewhat by reaching the third qualifying round of the FA Cup in successive years. Off the pitch, the club took a huge step forward when in November 2004 it successfully applied for planning permission to build a new stadium at James Whatman Way. However, construction of the stadium could not begin until a lease for the site was agreed with its owners, the Ministry of Defence.

The 2005–06 season saw Maidstone, now managed by Lloyd Hume after a spell in charge from Mal Watkins, win the Kent League title. They spent the season toe-to-toe with Beckenham Town before securing the championship on the final day of the season. The title win meant the club finally gained promotion to Step 4 of the non league pyramid, joining the Isthmian League Division One South. However perhaps more importantly, the club's bid to return to Maidstone was another step closer when a 99-year lease was signed for the land at James Whatman Way, meaning the club was now free to start building on it.

2006–2015: The Isthmian League years
Maidstone, who were now managed by Lloyd Hume and Alan Walker in a joint capacity, surprisingly managed to win the league at the first time of asking, gaining promotion to the Isthmian League Premier Division. However the overwhelming success on the pitch was overshadowed by little visible progress being made in the building of the stadium at James Whatman Way.

Before the 2007–08 season had even begun Alan Walker was involved in a freak accident at a coaching course in Belfast which left him temporarily paralysed. Walker made a valiant recovery however, and was back walking and in management by the start of the league season. Maidstone struggled in the new surroundings of the Isthmian League Premier Division and spent the majority of the season near the foot of the table, despite having the services of Chris Smalling at their disposal, however they avoided relegation after beating Folkestone Invicta 1–0 on the last day of the season, a result that relegated Invicta in Maidstone's place. In other news 25% of the club was sold to businessman Oliver Ash in February 2008.

The 2008–09 was another tough season for Maidstone. The squad who came so close to relegation the year before was largely dismantled with a whole raft of new players replacing them. During the close season it had become increasingly apparent the club could not afford to field a competitive Isthmian Premier team and fund the building of a new stadium, so with what limited funds the club had seemingly tied up in paying new players it was decided to try and fund the construction at James Whatman Way by bidding for a £1.2million grant from the Football Foundation. The bid was turned down in October 2008 and the club was subsequently put up for sale by chairman Paul Bowden-Brown. However no takeover was forthcoming and as a result of this the club had no choice but to halve their wage bill from £6000 to £3000 per week. The majority of the players took pay cuts and led Maidstone to their best league finish since reforming, finishing a comfortable 15th in the Isthmian Premier table and reaching the 4th qualifying round of the FA Cup.

During the 2009 close season Maidstone moved from their temporary Bourne Park home in Sittingbourne to Ashford Town's stadium, The Homelands, citing lower rent and a deal to receive a percentage of refreshment takings as the reason for the move. However the move only increased Maidstone's financial woes due to a sharp drop in attendances, and in December 2009 it was revealed two months of staff pay was to be deferred to the end of the season, a move that led to Alan Walker and Lloyd Hume resigning as managers of the club. Reserve team boss Pete Nott stepped up to the first team managers role and led Maidstone to an 18th-place finish, avoiding relegation with a game to spare.

In October 2010 the club was taken over by shareholder Oliver Ash and Terry Casey with Paul Bowden-Brown stepping down as Chairman. In November 2010 the club's new directors sacked first team boss Peter Nott and his backroom staff with the team bottom of the table and out of the FA Cup. Former Gravesend & Northfleet manager Andy Ford was swiftly appointed manager, but he could not improve the club's fortunes and resigned in March 2011 with the club bottom of the league and 8 points adrift from safety. Club captain Jay Saunders was appointed caretaker manager until the end of the season, and although he oversaw the team to 5 wins from nine games he could not save Maidstone from relegation. Saunders was subsequently given the permanent managers job.

In the 2011 close season the club returned to groundshare at Sittingbourne's Bourne Park after their two-year spell at Ashford's Homelands Stadium, and soon after construction finally began on the club's new ground The Gallagher Stadium. The club finished the season in sixth place, just outside the play-offs.

The 2012 close season saw Maidstone finally come home, moving into the Gallagher Stadium in July 2012. The club opened the £2.6 million stadium with a showpiece friendly against Brighton & Hove Albion in front of a sell-out crowd. After a two-horse race for the Isthmian League Division One South title with Dulwich Hamlet, and regularly playing in front of crowds of 1,500+, Maidstone eventually won promotion to the Isthmian League Premier Division after beating Faversham Town 3–0 in the Isthmian League Division One South play-off final.

During the 2014–15 season, Maidstone United qualified for the first round proper of the FA Cup for the first time in their history.  Maidstone played a goalless draw away to Stevenage of League Two and in the replay at home in front of a capacity crowd went through to the second round proper, winning 2–1.  In the second round Maidstone lost 3–1 at Wrexham of the Conference Premier.

Maidstone United went on to win the Isthmian Premier title following a season-long battle with Margate, then Dulwich Hamlet and finally Hendon. The title was effectively won at Champion Hill, home of Dulwich Hamlet, on 18 April 2015 with Maidstone United drawing 0–0 and Hendon drawing 0–0 away at Grays Athletic. The near-1,000 travelling Stones fans celebrated on the pitch with the Dulwich Hamlet fans, their best position since reforming.  The title was officially won on home soil on 25 April 2015 with a 3–2 win over East Thurrock United.

2015–present: The National League
After winning the Isthmian League Premier Division, Maidstone United were promoted to the National League South (formerly the Conference South).  In the 2015–16 season the team again qualified for the first round proper of the FA Cup where they narrowly lost 1–0 at home to League Two side Yeovil Town in front of a record-breaking crowd of 2,811.

On 14 May 2016, Maidstone United were promoted to the National League after defeating Ebbsfleet United in the National League South promotion final at Stonebridge Road. The match finished 2–2 after extra time, and Maidstone won 4–3 in the resulting penalty shoot-out. Maidstone were relegated back to the National League South after three seasons in the National League by finishing in 24th place in 2018–19. In the 2021–22 season, Maidstone won the National League South title.

Shirts, colours and badge

Since reformation Maidstone's home shirts have been amber with black trim. All white was the template used for away shirts, but from 2009 to 2013 the club wore sky blue. They returned to a white away kit in the summer of 2013. In 2017, the away kit was changed to purple shirt, shorts and socks, with a white trim around the sleeves.

Shirt manufacturers and sponsors

Stadiums

Maidstone United play their home games at The Gallagher Stadium, James Whatman Way, Maidstone, Kent, ME14 1LQ.

After the original club folded, the new Maidstone United played their games on a pitch behind a Mormon meeting house, which had originally been the MUFC reserves and training pitch – just metres from where the old ground had been. Promotion to the Kent League in 2001 meant the club had to move away yet again as the current ground was nowhere near up to standard. The club had earmarked James Whatman Way as the site of a new ground in Maidstone, but until this was built they would have to groundshare outside the town. Maidstone played for a year at Sittingbourne's old Central Park stadium before relocating, along with the "Brickies", to Bourne Park, a converted training pitch behind the main Central Park complex. Unable to generate the funds to build at Whatman Way, The Stones stayed at Bourne Park until 2009, before moving to groundshare with Ashford Town, citing favourable rent and a cut of food and bar takings as the reason for the move. The move to Ashford caused a sharp dip in attendances and the club returned to ground share at Bourne Park for the 2011–12 season; however the club finally moved into James Whatman Way, known as the Gallagher Stadium, at the start of the 2012–13 season.

Support
Maidstone returned to their home town and home crowds surged by 350% to average 1,698 in the league during the 2012–13 season at the club's new Gallagher Stadium. The table below gives a summary of the attendance figures in all of Maidstone United's league games since the club's final season in the Kent County League in the 2000–01 season.

Maidstones Melbourne supporters base was founded by Mitch and Jon Beamish in December 2018.

No attendances were recorded for Season 2020-21, due to COVID-19 restrictions.

Rivalries
Maidstone fans have traditionally had a strong rivalry with Gillingham. The old Maidstone are the only traditional Kent club to ever join Gillingham in the Football League, and contested a total of 11 games with Gillingham in the old Division 4 and FA Cup in the 1980s and early 1990s. There have been only two matches since the Stones reformed, the first being a mid-season friendly in 2002 at Central Park, and the second being a Kent Senior Cup quarter final tie in 2018, a game which Maidstone won 2–1.

A rivalry also remains with Tonbridge Angels. Back in the 1970s, the old Maidstone United and the 'Angels' regularly met in the Southern League before Maidstone moved on to become founder members of the National League (then known as the Alliance Premier League). The two clubs were reconciled after Maidstone's reformation, meeting in the 2002–03 FA Cup – with the Stones winning 3–2. The clubs then met regularly in the Isthmian League Premier Division between 2007 and 2011 and again in the 2014–15 season. In January 2015, there was a "confrontation" between Tonbridge Angels coach Barry Moore and a Maidstone supporter after a game between the sides. Moore was banned by the FA for four months following the incident.

Old Southern League foes Ebbsfleet United (then Gravesend & Northfleet) have perhaps become the club's biggest current-day rivals, with the clubs' recent time together in the National League and National League South punctuated by ill-will both at boardroom level and on the terraces.

Fan culture
Stones Live! is a radio station run since 2008, offering commentary from most matches plus other club-related content. It was voted Sports Station of the Year at the 2010–11 Internet Radio Awards. A fanzine site “Plastic Passion” was launched in February 2014, in part to celebrate one of the most successful eras in the club's history. Plastic Passion spawned a spin off book, believed to be the first ever Maidstone United e-book, “When I was Just A Little Boy” in 2016. A second book, this time available in physical form, "Exodus" was published in December 2016, detailing the period between 1988 and 2012 and the struggle to find a permanent home.

The Football League era saw the birth of four fanzines, "Show Me The Way To Go Home", "Spirit of London Road (aka S.O.L.D)", "Yellow Fever", later renamed "Golden Days", and "The Foundation Stone" which ran for just a couple of issues. In 2000, with the club languishing in the Kent County League, a fanzine known as “SHAFTED!” ran for five issues. By the time the club returned to the Kent League in 2001 the team behind Show Me The Way To Go Home decided to revive it after almost ten years. It ran for several seasons and was highly acclaimed. In 2005 it was named as one of the best 11 fanzines in the country by the Independent, although it had ceased publication before the club returned to Maidstone in 2012. The void was eventually filled by "It's All Gone Amber", which was first published in 2015. It was named after the line uttered by commentator Derek Rae when Frannie Collin scored the winner for Maidstone against Stevenage in an FA Cup first round replay in 2014.

First team

Reserves, youth and community

Maidstone's youth and community sides are currently members of the Isthmian Youth League and Kent Youth League as well as being members of various local, women's/girls', deaf and disability leagues.

The club also runs an Academy, giving over fifty 16 to 18-year-old players the chance to study, train and play at the Gallagher Stadium. Players study for a BTEC Level 3 in Sport and a range of vocational football-related qualifications, and also play in the Conference Youth Alliance.

Maidstone's youth teams have provided many players to the first team in recent years. The most successful and high-profile product of the club's youth system is England international Chris Smalling, who spent three years at the club before moving to Fulham and subsequently to Manchester United and AS Roma. Smalling made a total of 16 appearances for Maidstone, and whilst playing for the club he also played for England Schoolboys' Under 18 side. 

The club has a strong emphasis on football for the community and most of its teams train at the Gallagher Stadium. As well as boys and girls teams at most ages, there are PAN disability and deaf teams. United are a Charter Standard Community Club and were one of the first clubs in the country to sign up to the Deaf Friendly Football Clubs pledge.

Club staff and officials

Notable players
This list comprises former or current players who have made over 100 appearances in a fully professional league or have senior international experience.

  Dean Beckwith
  Steve Butler
  Jermaine Darlington
  Roland Edge
  Paul Haylock
  Jon Harley
  Peter Hawkins
  Zavon Hines
  Garry Kimble
  Stuart Lewis
  Karl Murray
  Magnus Okuonghae
  Joe Pigott
  Alan Pouton
  Jake Robinson
  Bradley Sandeman
  Mark Saunders
  Ian Selley
  Chris Smalling
  Neil Smith
  Alan Walker
  Simon Walton
  Lawrie Wilson
  Jamar Loza
  Hady Ghandour
  Adrian Webster
  Yemi Odubade
  Andre Boucaud
  Ian Cox
  Kelvin Jack
  Jake Cassidy

Managerial history

League history

Honours

League
National League South (Tier 6) 
Champions (1): 2021–22
 Play-off winners (1): 2015–16
Isthmian League Premier Division (Tier 7) 
Champions (1): 2014–15

Isthmian League Division One South (Tier 8)
Champions (1): 2006–07
Runners-up (1): 2012–13
Play-off winners (1): 2012–13

Kent League Premier Division
Champions (2): 2001–02, 2005–06
Runners-up (1): 2002–03
Kent County League Premier Division
Champions (1): 2000–01
Kent County League Division One
Champions (1): 1998–99
Kent County League Division Two
Champions (1): 1994–95
Kent County League Division Four
Champions (1): 1993–94

Cups
Isthmian League Cup
Winners (1): 2013–14
Isthmian Charity Shield
Winners (1): 2015–16
Premier Division Cup
Winners (2): 2001–02, 2005–06

Challenge/Charity Shield
Winners (2): 2002–03, 2003–04
Runners up (1): 2006–07
Kent Senior Cup
Winners (2): 2017–18, 2018–19
Kent Senior Trophy
Winners (1): 2002–03

Weald of Kent Charity Cup
Winners (2): 1999–00, 2000–01
Kent Junior Cup
Winners (1): 1994–95
Tunbridge Wells Charity Cup
Winners (1): 1993–94

Records and statistics

Maidstone's best ever league finish came in the 2016–17 season when they came 14th in the National League. Maidstone's highest ever victory came in their first season since reforming, beating Aylesford 12–1 in the Kent County League Division Four. The club's record attendance came at the Gallagher Stadium, when a capacity 4,175 spectators saw Maidstone play Hampton and Richmond on 4 May 2022 in the final game of the 2021–22 Season to see the Stones lift the National League South trophy, the previous highest attendance was 4,105 on 15 July 2017 in a pre-season match to celebrate the fifth anniversary of the Gallagher Stadium. The club's appearance record is held by Tom Mills.

References

External links

 Official Website
 STONEStv – match highlights from Maidstone matches
 Stones Live! – Maidstone United's internet radio station
 Maidstone United unofficial forum
 Plastic Passion website – online fanzine
 Bring The Stones Home – official website for the Stones' return to the town
 Every match result and League table when in the Football League
 Maidstone Youth and Community website

 
Isthmian League
Southern Counties East Football League
National League (English football) clubs
Football clubs in Kent
Association football clubs established in 1992
Maidstone
1992 establishments in England
Phoenix clubs (association football)
Football clubs in England